Macrothyatira is a genus of moths belonging to the subfamily Thyatirinae of the Drepanidae.

Selected species
Macrothyatira arizana (Wileman, 1910)
Macrothyatira arizana diminuta (Houlbert, 1921)
Macrothyatira conspicua (Leech, 1900)
Macrothyatira danieli Werny, 1966
Macrothyatira fasciata (Houlbert, 1921)
Macrothyatira flavida (Butler, 1885)
Macrothyatira flavimargo (Leech, 1900)
Macrothyatira labiata (Gaede, 1930)
Macrothyatira oblonga (Poujade, 1887)
Macrothyatira stramineata (Warren, 1912)
Macrothyatira subaureata (Sick, 1941)
Macrothyatira transitans (Houlbert, 1921)

References 

 , 1916, Insect World 20 (2): 48
 , 2007, Esperiana Buchreihe zur Entomologie Band 13: 1-683 

Thyatirinae
Drepanidae genera